This is a list of countries by bauxite production in 2020. It exhibits certain changes from the geographical rankings of 2018.

Data

Citations 

Lists of countries by mineral production
Bauxite mining